Oskar Fredrik Lindberg (23 February 1887 – 10 April 1955) was a Swedish composer, church musician, teacher and professor. In 1939 he edited the Church of Sweden's hymnbook. His 1912 Requiem was of particular importance to the history of Swedish liturgical works.

At a meeting in  Gagnefs missionary hall he heard a song that made a deep impression on him. For a radio broadcast in 1936 he arranged an organ piece based on this melody which became known as the  Gammal fäbodpsalm från Dalarna.  Today this is his best known and most frequently performed work. He wrote in a romantic idiom which blended features of composers such as Rachmaninoff and Sibelius with folk music and impressionistic elements.

Lindberg was also prominent as a teacher, holding posts in the conservatory in Stockholm as well as in local high schools.  He was a member of the Swedish Royal Academy of music from 1926 until his death.

Lindberg was born in Gagnef, Dalarna, Sweden in 1887. He died in Stockholm in 1955. He was the uncle of jazz musician and composer Nils Lindberg.

References

1887 births
1955 deaths
20th-century classical composers
Classical composers of church music
Litteris et Artibus recipients
Romantic composers
Swedish classical composers
Swedish male classical composers
Swedish classical organists
Male classical organists
20th-century organists
20th-century Swedish male musicians
20th-century Swedish musicians
19th-century male musicians